John Prentice may refer to:

John Prentice (businessman), chairman of the Shanghai Municipal Council
John Prentice (cartoonist)
John Prentice (footballer, born 1898)
John Prentice (footballer, born 1926) 
John Rockefeller Prentice (1902-1972), lawyer
John Prentice, fictional character played by Sidney Poitier in the 1967 film Guess Who's Coming to Dinner

See also
John Prentis, mayor of Williamsburg, Virginia
John Holmes Prentiss, U.S. Representative